Chelsea Film Festival (CFF) is an international film festival and a non-profit organization based in New York which screens independent films from emerging directors. The festival offers a wide range of films, including documentaries and feature-lengths, focusing on the theme of “Global Issues”.

History
Chelsea Film Festival was founded in 2013 by French actresses Ingrid Jean-Baptiste & Sonia Jean-Baptiste.

An advisory board was set up to oversee the selection of the films and the operation of the festival.

The first edition of the Chelsea Film Festival presented nine feature length-films and eight short films, representing 13 countries and 17 first-time filmmakers, including seven in competition. Eight of the films at the Festival were United States premieres, and one was a world premiere.

In March 2019, Chelsea Film Festival was featured in the Top 10 Best Film Festivals in North America by the American Newspaper USA Today.

Awards 

Awards are presented in several categories; the winning films are selected by a jury of film experts as well as the audience. 
The "Charging Bull" replica for a time was the official trophy, until 2021 when the Chelsea Film Festival presented Acrylic trophies.

Grand Prix Award

Audience Award

Best Director Award

Best Screenplay Award

Best Actress Award

Best Actor Award

Best Supporting Actor Award

Best Supporting Actress Award

References

External links 

"Official Website"

Film festivals in New York City

CFF Featured in the Top 10 Best Film Festivals in North America by USA Today.

Chelsea Film Festival's only female feature director 'celebrates empowerment' in 'Maki'   

Laura Smet at the 6th Annual Chelsea Film Festival for THOMAS 

The Visit, starring Oscar Nominee June Squibb (Nebraska) & Sean Maher (Firefly) screening at the Chelsea Film Festival